Jackky Bhagnani (born 25 December 1984) is an Indian actor, film producer and entrepreneur.

Early life
Bhagnani was born in Kolkata, West Bengal in India to a Sindhi family. After schooling, he got a degree in commerce from H.R. College of Commerce and Economics, Mumbai. He has also done an acting course from Lee Strasberg Theatre and the Film Institute in New York.

Career
Jackky's debut film was Kal Kissne Dekha, which came out in 2009. The movie received mostly negative reviews and was unsuccessful at the box office. Taran Adarsh, writing for Bollywood Hungama, noted that "The film lacks the fun that one normally associates with a campus fare. Even the climax leaves a lot to be desired."

In April 2011, he starred in F.A.L.T.U. The film received mixed reviews and did moderately well at the box office. In May 2015, Jackky revealed that a sequel to the movie has been planned.

In 2012, Ajab Gazabb Love was released, but was a non-starter at the box office.

Rangrezz, directed by Priyadarshan, was released in 2014. It garnered excellent reviews and featured Jackky Bhagnani dancing to Psy's "Gangnam Style". The rights to the song were bought by Jackky's father Vashu Bhagnani, also the producer of the film, for an undisclosed sum. Despite this, the film failed to leave a mark at the box office.

Jackky's next film was Youngistaan, a love story set against the backdrop of Indian politics. Released in 2014, the movie was panned by critics and was a commercial failure.

The movie later became the subject of much controversy when it was revealed that it was India's independent entry to the Oscars. Twitter was abuzz with jokes on Jackky Bhagnani, with users expressing surprise and dismay over the movie's selection.

In 2015, Jackky starred as Kedar Patel in the comedy film Welcome to Karachi, which was released on 28 May 2015. In 2016, he turned to film producing with Sarbjit along with his sister Deepshikha Deshmukh. Sarbjit was a commercially successful movie. In 2017, he produced and acted in a short film 'Carbon' released on YouTube. In 2018, he produced Dil Juunglee and Welcome to New York. He made his Tamil film debut opposite Trisha in the horror film Mohini. Jackky will next be seen in the movie Anandwaa which will be directed by Abir Sengupta.

Personal life
Bhagnani is in a relationship with Rakul Preet Singh since 2021.

Filmography

As an actor

Music videos

As a producer

Awards and nominations

References

External links

 
 Jackky Bhagnani on Facebook

Indian male film actors
Sindhi people
Living people
Male actors from Kolkata
1984 births
International Indian Film Academy Awards winners